The 2004–05 Vermont Catamounts men's basketball team represented the University of Vermont during the 2004–05 NCAA Division I men's basketball season. The Catamounts, led by head coach Tom Brennan – coaching in his 19th and final season, played their home games at Patrick Gym and were members of the America East Conference. They finished the season 25–7, 16–2 in America East play to win the regular season conference title. They followed that success by winning the America East tournament to earn an automatic bid to the NCAA tournament. Playing as the No. 13 seed in the Austin region, the Catamounts knocked off No. 4 seed Syracuse in the opening round before losing to No. 5 seed and eventual Final Four participant Michigan State in the round of 32.

This season marked the third straight season the Catamounts played in the NCAA Tournament, while also earning their first NCAA Tournament victory. Senior forward Taylor Coppenrath established the single-season scoring record at Vermont and finished second on the school's all-time scoring list. Fellow senior, guard T. J. Sorrentine finished his career a spot behind Coppenrath. Through the 2021–22 season, both players remain on the top 10 list in two other categories – rebounds and blocks for Coppenrath, and assists and steals for Sorrentine.

Roster

Schedule and results

|-
!colspan=9 style=| Regular season

|-
!colspan=9 style=| America East tournament

|-
!colspan=9 style=| NCAA Tournament

Awards and honors
Taylor Coppenrath – America East Player of the Year (3x)

References

Vermont Catamounts men's basketball seasons
Vermont
Vermont
Cat
Cat